The UNO Shopping was a shopping mall in Leonding, Upper Austria and is located southwest of Linz. It was opened on 16 October 1990. In 2007, the mall had a revenue of 145 Million Euro. Since July 2012, the mall is empty with the exception of an apothecary and a consumer electronic retailer in an external part of the complex.

Criticism 

One point of criticism was, that purchasing power was  transferred away from the city center of Linz. Another one was the enormous volume of traffic produced by several other businesses along Kremstal A-Road, one of the main routes entering Linz.

References

Shopping malls in Austria
Buildings and structures in Upper Austria
Defunct shopping malls
Economy of Upper Austria
1990 establishments in Austria
Shopping malls established in 1990
2012 disestablishments in Austria
Shopping malls disestablished in 2012
20th-century architecture in Austria